Rosie Casals and Billie Jean King were the defending champions, but decided not to play together. Casals partnered with Virginia Wade but lost in the semifinals to Judy Dalton and Françoise Dürr.

King and her partner Betty Stöve defeated Dalton and Dürr in the final, 6–2, 4–6, 6–3 to win the ladies' doubles tennis title at the 1972 Wimbledon Championships.

Seeds

  Billie Jean King /  Betty Stöve (champions)
  Rosie Casals /  Virginia Wade (semifinals)
  Judy Dalton /  Françoise Dürr (final)
  Evonne Goolagong /  Nell Truman (second round)

Draw

Finals

Top half

Section 1

Section 2

Bottom half

Section 3

Section 4

References

External links

1972 Wimbledon Championships – Women's draws and results at the International Tennis Federation

Women's Doubles
Wimbledon Championship by year – Women's doubles
Wimbledon Championships
Wimbledon Championships